Vohs is a German surname. Notable people with this surname include:

 Dieter Vohs (born 1935), German waterpolo player
 Friederike Vohs (1777–1860), German actress and operatic soprano
 Heinrich Vohs (1763–1804), German actor and singer
 Joan Vohs (1927–2001), American model and film and television actress